Inés Enríquez Frödden (1913–1998) was a Chilean politician (socialist). She became the first female Intendant in Chile in 1950, and the first female representative of the Lower House in 1951. She focused on the social rights of women and children.

References 
 Campos Harriet, Fernando (1980) [1979]. Historia de Concepción 1550–1970 (II edición). Santiago de Chile: Editorial Universitaria. p. 382.

1913 births
1998 deaths
Members of the Chamber of Deputies of Chile
20th-century Chilean women politicians
20th-century Chilean politicians
Women members of the Chamber of Deputies of Chile
Place of birth missing